The Mount Pleasant Community School District is a public school district headquartered in Mount Pleasant, Iowa.  The district is mainly in Henry County, but has small areas in Jefferson, Lee, and Van Buren counties.  The district serves the city of Mount Pleasant and the surrounding area, primarily Salem, Westwood, Rome, Swedesburg, and rural area students.

Schools
The district has seven schools. all located in Mount Pleasant:
Lincoln Elementary
Harlan Elementary
Van Allen Elementary
Salem Elementary
Mount Pleasant Community Middle School
Mount Pleasant Community High School
WisdomQuest Education Center

The MPCSD also provides the educational component for the Christamore House, a court-appointed juvenile facility located in Mount Pleasant.

See also
List of school districts in Iowa

References

External links 
http://www.mt-pleasant.k12.ia.us/
Mount Pleasant Music Boosters

Education in Henry County, Iowa
School districts in Iowa
Mount Pleasant, Iowa